Mary Carter Reitano (born 1934) is a former tennis player from Australia.

Mary Carter may also refer to:

People
Mary Carter Smith (1919–2007), American educator
Laura-Mary Carter, member of the British band Blood Red Shoes
Mary Kennedy Carter (1934–2010), social studies teacher and civil rights activist
Mary Carter (judge) (1923–2010), Saskatchewan judge
Mary Adaline Edwarda Carter, American industrial art instructor and designer
Mary Randolph Carter, American author, photographer, and collector

Other uses
Mary Carter Warwick, birthname of Erica Lovejoy, a character on the American soap opera The Bold and the Beautiful
"The Mary Ellen Carter", a 1979 song written and recorded by Stan Rogers